The 1966 Denver Broncos season was the seventh season for the team in the American Football League (AFL). For the second straight season the Broncos posted a record of four wins, and ten losses, last again in the AFL's Western Division. Following the second game of the season, head coach Mac Speedie abruptly resigned, and offensive line coach Ray Malavasi was the interim head coach for the remaining twelve games.

Denver's offense set a dubious all-time AFL record in 1966 with the fewest total points scored in a season, with 196, or 14 per game. The Broncos are the last team in major professional football (AFL or NFL) to go an entire game without picking up a first down, which they did in Week One at Houston.

Personnel

Staff

Regular season

Schedule

With the expansion Miami Dolphins joining the AFL in 1966, there were an odd-number (9)of teams for two seasons, resulting in multiple bye weeks for each team.

Standings

References

External links
Denver Broncos – 1966 media guide
1966 Denver Broncos at Pro-Football-Reference.com

Denver Broncos seasons
Denver Broncos
1966 in sports in Colorado